Amrita Narlikar is the president of the German Institute for Global and Area Studies (GIGA)  and Professor of International Relations at the Faculty of Economic and Social Sciences at the University of Hamburg, Germany. She is also an Honorary Fellow of Darwin College (University of Cambridge), a non-resident senior fellow at the Observer Research Foundation (ORF),  a Distinguished International Fellow of the Indian Association of International Studies (IAIS).

She was previously Reader in International Political Economy in the Department of Politics and International Studies (POLIS) at the University of Cambridge, founding director of the Centre for Rising Powers, and a Fellow of Darwin College, Cambridge. She works in the fields of international negotiations, the political economy of international trade, and rising powers. Narlikar is the daughter of journalist and author Aruna Narlikar and physicist Anant V. Narlikar. She is the granddaughter of physicist Vishnu Vasudev Narlikar.

Career

Amrita Narlikar was awarded her MPhil and DPhil from Oxford University (Balliol College), on an Inlaks Scholarship and was then appointed to a junior research fellowship at St John's College, Oxford. She also has a master's degree from the School of International Studies, Jawaharlal Nehru University, and a bachelor's degree in history from St. Stephen's College, Delhi.

before moving to Hamburg, she held the position of reader in international political economy at the University of Cambridge and a fellowship at Darwin College. She was also a senior research associate at the Centre for International Studies at the University of Oxford from 2003 to 2014.

Publications

Amrita Narlikar has authored/edited eleven books. Her most recent book has been published by Cambridge University Press:

Poverty Narratives in International Trade Negotiations and Beyond, New York: CUP, 2020 

Her previous books include:

Bargaining with a Rising India: Lessons from the Mahabharata (co-authored), Oxford: Oxford University Press, 2014 

The Oxford Handbook on the World Trade Organization (co-edited), Oxford: Oxford University Press, 2012 

Deadlocks in Multilateral Negotiations: Causes and Solutions (edited), Cambridge: Cambridge University Press, 2010 

She has also published numerous articles in Foreign Affairs, International Affairs, Global Policy, etc.

Policy Advice

The policy relevance of her research brings Amrita into frequent and close exchange with practitioners.  She has authored several policy briefs — e.g. for Munich Security Times, Heinrich-Böll-Stiftung, CIGI, Commonwealth Secretariat etc., and has had her expertise cited in a range of media outlets — e.g. Frankfurter Allgemeine Zeitung, Der Tagesspiegel, Die Welt, Spiegel Online, Deutsche Welle, NDR, BBC, etc.

References

External links 
 Amrita Narlikar's Website at GIGA Hamburg
 POLIS faculty page
 Global Policy Journal
 Aus Politik und Zeitgeschichte
 Wir brauchen eine neue Form der Globalisierung

Living people
Academics of the University of Cambridge
Fellows of Darwin College, Cambridge
Date of birth missing (living people)
Nationality missing
Year of birth missing (living people)